Yuba Airport  is a privately owned, public use airport in Grand Traverse County, Michigan, United States. It is located four nautical miles (5 mi, 7 km) south of the central business district of Elk Rapids, Michigan.

Facilities and aircraft 
Yuba Airport covers an area of 80 acres (32 ha) at an elevation of 645 feet (197 m) above mean sea level. It has one runway designated 18/36 with a turf surface measuring 2,975 by 100 feet (907 x 30 m). For the 12-month period ending December 31, 2006, the airport had 100 general aviation aircraft operations.

References

External links 
 Aerial image as of April 1998 from USGS The National Map

Airports in Michigan
Defunct airports in Michigan
Transportation in Grand Traverse County, Michigan